Interstate 795 is the designation for several Interstate Highways in the United States, all related to Interstate 95:
Interstate 795 (Florida), a planned connector southeast of Jacksonville
Interstate 795 (Maryland), a spur to Reisterstown
Interstate 795 (North Carolina), a spur to Goldsboro

95-7
7